The 1240s was a decade of the Julian Calendar which began on January 1, 1240, and ended on December 31, 1249.

Significant people

Fibonacci. Fibonacci sequence and Liber Abbaci

References